Connective tissue (also called fibrous tissue) is one of the four primary types of animal tissue, along with epithelial tissue, muscle tissue, and nervous tissue. It develops from the mesenchyme, derived from the mesoderm, the middle embryonic germ layer. Connective tissue is found in between other tissues everywhere in the body, including the nervous system. The three meninges, membranes that envelop the brain and  spinal cord are composed of connective tissue. Most types of connective tissue consists of three main components: elastic and collagen fibers, ground substance, and cells. Blood, and lymph are classed as specialized fluid connective tissues that do not contain fiber. All are immersed in the body water. The cells of connective tissue include fibroblasts, adipocytes, macrophages, mast cells and leucocytes.

The term "connective tissue" (in German, Bindegewebe) was introduced in 1830 by Johannes Peter Müller. The tissue was already recognized as a distinct class in the 18th century.

Types

Connective tissue can be broadly classified into connective tissue proper, and special connective tissue.

Connective tissue proper
Connective tissue proper consists of loose connective tissue (including reticular connective tissue and adipose tissue) and dense connective tissue (subdivided into dense regular and dense irregular connective tissues.) Loose and dense connective tissue are distinguished by the ratio of ground substance to fibrous tissue. Loose connective tissue has much more ground substance and a relative lack of fibrous tissue, while the reverse is true of dense connective tissue. Dense regular connective tissue, found in structures such as tendons and ligaments, is characterized by collagen fibers arranged in an orderly parallel fashion, giving it tensile strength in one direction. Dense irregular connective tissue provides strength in multiple directions by its dense bundles of fibers arranged in all directions.

Special connective tissue
Special connective tissue consists of cartilage, bone, and blood. Other kinds of connective tissues include fibrous, elastic, and lymphoid connective tissues. Fibroareolar tissue is a mix of fibrous and areolar tissue. Fibromuscular tissue is made up of fibrous tissue and muscular tissue. New vascularised connective tissue that forms in the process of wound healing is termed granulation tissue. All of the special connective tissue types have been included as a subset of fascia in the fascial system.

Bone and cartilage can be further classified as supportive connective tissue. Blood and lymph can also be categorized as fluid connective tissue.

Membranes
Membranes can be either of connective tissue or epithelial tissue. Connective tissue membranes include the meninges (the three membranes covering the brain and spinal cord) and synovial membranes that line joint cavities. Mucous membranes and serous membranes are epithelial with an underlying layer of loose connective tissue.

Fibrous types
Fiber types found in the extracellular matrix are collagen fibers, elastic fibers, and reticular fibers.
Ground substance is a clear, colorless, and viscous fluid containing glycosaminoglycans and proteoglycans allowing fixation of Collagen fibers in intercellular spaces. Examples of non-fibrous connective tissue include adipose tissue (fat) and blood. Adipose tissue gives "mechanical cushioning" to the body, among other functions. Although there is no dense collagen network in adipose tissue, groups of adipose cells are kept together by collagen fibers and collagen sheets in order to keep fat tissue under compression in place (for example, the sole of the foot). Both the ground substance and proteins (fibers) create the matrix for connective tissue.

Type I collagen is present in many forms of connective tissue, and makes up about 25% of the total protein content of the mammalian body.

Function

Connective tissue has a wide variety of functions that depend on the types of cells and the different classes of fibers involved. Loose and dense irregular connective tissue, formed mainly by fibroblasts and collagen fibers, have an important role in providing a medium for oxygen and nutrients to diffuse from capillaries to cells, and carbon dioxide and waste substances to diffuse from cells back into circulation. They also allow organs to resist stretching and tearing forces. Dense regular connective tissue, which forms organized structures, is a major functional component of tendons, ligaments and aponeuroses, and is also found in highly specialized organs such as the cornea. Elastic fibers, made from elastin and fibrillin, also provide resistance to stretch forces. They are found in the walls of large blood vessels and in certain ligaments, particularly in the ligamenta flava.

In hematopoietic and lymphatic tissues, reticular fibers made by reticular cells provide the stroma—or structural support—for the parenchyma—or functional part—of the organ.

Mesenchyme is a type of connective tissue found in developing organs of embryos that is capable of differentiation into all types of mature connective tissue. Another type of relatively undifferentiated connective tissue is the mucous connective tissue known as Wharton's jelly, found inside the umbilical cord.

Various types of specialized tissues and cells are classified under the spectrum of connective tissue, and are as diverse as brown and white adipose tissue, blood, cartilage and bone. Cells of the immune system, such as macrophages, mast cells, plasma cells and eosinophils are found scattered in loose connective tissue, providing the ground for starting inflammatory and immune responses upon the detection of antigens.

Clinical significance

There are many types of connective tissue disorders, such as:
 Connective tissue neoplasms including sarcomas such as hemangiopericytoma and malignant peripheral nerve sheath tumor in nervous tissue.
 Congenital diseases include Marfan syndrome and Ehlers-Danlos Syndrome.
 Myxomatous degeneration – a pathological weakening of connective tissue.
 Mixed connective tissue disease – a disease of the autoimmune system, also undifferentiated connective tissue disease.
 Systemic lupus erythematosus (SLE) – a major autoimmune disease of connective tissue
 Scurvy, caused by a deficiency of vitamin C which is necessary for the synthesis of collagen.
 Fibromuscular dysplasia is a disease of the blood vessels that leads to an abnormal growth in the arterial wall.

See also
 Endometrium
 Parametrium

Notes and references

External links

 Overview, University of Kansas 
 Connective tissue atlas, University of Iowa
 Heritable disorders of connective tissue US National Institute of Arthritis and Musculoskeletal and Skin Diseases
 Connective tissue photomicrographs